Qarah Hajjilu (also Romanized as Qarah Ḩājjīlū and Qareh Ḩājjīlū; also known as Qara Hāji, Qarah Ḩājīlū, and Qareh Ḩājjlū) is a village in Qaflankuh-e Sharqi Rural District, Kaghazkonan District, Meyaneh County, East Azerbaijan Province, Iran. At the 2006 census, its population was 100, in 26 families.

References 

Populated places in Meyaneh County